Randy Pullen is a Republican Party activist. He is a former Chairman of the Arizona Republican Party; he served as chairman from 2007 to 2011. He is Chairman of WageWatch, a former Arizona Republican National Committeeman, and former Treasurer of the Republican National Committee. Pullman sought the Republican nomination for Arizona State Treasurer in 2014, losing in the primary to Jeff DeWit.

Notes

External links 
 Randy Pullen!s website
 

Living people
Arizona Republican Party chairs
2008 United States presidential electors
Year of birth missing (living people)